The common carpet or white-banded toothed carpet (Epirrhoe alternata) is a moth of the family Geometridae. The species was first described by Otto Friedrich Müller in 1764. It is found throughout the Palearctic and the Near East.  In North America it ranges across the northern tier of the United States plus every province and territory of Canada.

The wingspan is 27–30 mm. The forewings vary from grey to black, marked with white fascia, giving a striped appearance. The hindwings are paler grey with white fascia. Northern races tend to be paler overall. One or two broods are produced each year, and the adults may be seen any time from May to September. The species flies at night and is attracted to light.

The larva is generally brown or green but is very variable in its markings. It feeds on bedstraw. The species overwinters as a pupa.

  The flight season refers to the British Isles. This may vary in other parts of the range.

References
Chinery, Michael Collins Guide to the Insects of Britain and Western Europe 1986 (Reprinted 1991)
Skinner, Bernard Colour Identification Guide to Moths of the British Isles 1984

External links
Common carpet at UKMoths

Lepidoptera of Belgium
Lepiforum e.V.
De Vlinderstichting 

Epirrhoe
Moths described in 1764
Moths of Europe
Moths of Asia
Moths of Iceland
Taxa named by Otto Friedrich Müller